Thies Luijt (24 April 1879 – 8 July 1951) was a Dutch painter. His work was part of the art competitions at the 1928 Summer Olympics, the 1936 Summer Olympics, and the 1948 Summer Olympics.

References

1879 births
1951 deaths
20th-century Dutch painters
Dutch male painters
Olympic competitors in art competitions
People from Sliedrecht
20th-century Dutch male artists